Van Dessel Sports is a racing bicycle brand based in Mendham, New Jersey, United States. It was founded in 2000 by Edwin Bull, a former professional cyclist from Belgium. They specialize in cyclo-cross bicycles and hard-tail mountain bikes.

References

External links
www.vandesselcycles.com

Cycle manufacturers of the United States
Cyclo-cross
Manufacturing companies based in New Jersey
Companies based in Morris County, New Jersey
American companies established in 2000
Vehicle manufacturing companies established in 2000